The Nephin Beg Range or Nephin Mountains  is a mountain range in County Mayo, Republic of Ireland. The range contains the mountains of Slieve Carr (its highest peak), Nephin Beg, Birreencorragh and Corranabinnia/Cushcamcarragh, among others. The range hosts the Nephin forest, a 4,843 hectares forest managed by Coillte.

The range is in the process of becoming Ireland's first designated wilderness area, a 10-15 year project including remaking forest roads as walking trails and setting up huts for sustainable camping. The wilderness, when finished, is due to cover 16,000 hectares including a large amount of Ballycroy National Park and Coillte land.

References

External links
 Nephin Beg Mountain Views

Mountain ranges of Europe